Azanus moriqua, the black-bordered babul blue or thorn-tree blue, is a butterfly of the family Lycaenidae. It is found in the Afrotropical realm.

The wingspan is 19–24 mm in males and 19–25 mm in females. Its flight period is year-round but mainly between September and May.

The larvae feed on Acacia species.

References

moriqua
Butterflies described in 1857
Butterflies of Africa
Lepidoptera of Cape Verde